Yanjing Beer 2015 Chinese FA Cup was the 17th edition of Chinese FA Cup.

Schedule

Qualifying rounds

Group A

Group B

Tiebreakers
Guangzhou Haoxin, Dalianwan Qianguan and Dalian Ruiheng are ranked on head-to-head record.

Group C

Group D

First round

Second round

Third round

Fourth round

Fifth round

Semi-finals

First leg

Second leg

Shanghai Greenland Shenhua won 7–3 on aggregate.

Jiangsu Guoxin-Sainty won 4–1 on aggregate.

Final

First leg

Assistant referees:
 Huo Weiming
 Cao Yi
Fourth official:
 Li Haihe
 Sölvi Ottesen withdrew during the warm-up with injury and was replaced by Sammir.

Second leg

Assistant referees:
 A Lamusi
 Zhong Yong
Fourth official:
 Huang Yejun

Jiangsu Guoxin-Sainty won 1–0 on aggregate.

Awards
 Top Scorer(s):  Demba Ba (Shanghai Greenland Shenhua) (6 goals)
 Most Valuable Player:  Demba Ba (Shanghai Greenland Shenhua)
 Best Coach:  Dan Petrescu (Jiangsu Guoxin-Sainty)
 Fair Play Award: Xinjiang Dabancheng Nahuan
 Dark Horse Award: Xinjiang Dabancheng Nahuan

Top scorers

References

2015
2015 in Chinese football
2015 domestic association football cups
Jiangsu F.C. matches